The Jackson and Lansing Railroad (reporting marks JAIL) is a Class III common carrier in Central Michigan. The railroad runs for 47 miles, from Jackson, Michigan to Lansing, Michigan, on track leased from Norfolk Southern Railway for 20 years with an option to purchase the line when the lease expires. The railroad connects with Canadian National Railway and CSX Transportation in Lansing along with Norfolk Southern in Jackson. The Adrian and Blissfield Railroad holding company owns this railroad along with four other shortlines in Michigan.

References

Michigan railroads
Railway companies established in 2010
Spin-offs of the Norfolk Southern Railway
2010 establishments in Michigan